Lázaro Botelho Martins (born 11 February 1947) is a Brazilian politician and businessman. Although born in Maranhão, he has spent his political career representing Tocantins, having served as state representative from 2007 to 2019.

Personal life
Botelho was born to Joel Martins dos Reis and Luzia Botelho Martins Reis. Before entering politics Botelho worked as a businessman in trading in the stoke market.

Political career
Botelho voted in favor of the impeachment of then-president Dilma Rousseff. Botelho voted in favor of the 2017 Brazilian labor reform, and would vote against a corruption investigation into Rousseff's successor Michel Temer.

Botelho was investigated during Operation Car Wash for allegedly taking bribes from Petrobras, although the investigative committee ultimately decided there was not enough evidence to prosecute and Botelho was eventually declared innocent.

References

1947 births
Living people
People from Maranhão
Progressistas politicians
Members of the Chamber of Deputies (Brazil) from Tocantins
Brazilian businesspeople